Watten (meaning "ford" as in "river-crossing") is a commune in the Nord department in northern France. Its inhabitants are called "Wattenais".

Geography
Watten is located at the limit of the French Flanders historical county. However, the local Dutch dialect (French Flemish) is virtually extinct. The neighbouring villages are Wattendam (commune of Holque), Millam, Serques, Éperlecques and Wulverdinghe.

While Watten belongs to the Nord département, it is bordering the Pas-de-Calais département. The village is crossed by the rivers Aa and Colme.

Climate

Watten has a oceanic climate (Köppen climate classification Cfb).

Population

Heraldry

Sights
The village is famous for its old ruined abbey, and for its mill, which was restored in the 1990s. These two buildings are located on the "Mountain of Watten" (72 metres high). Its church dates from the thirteenth century.

Nearby is the Blockhaus d'Éperlecques, a massive German bunker site from World War Two, wrecked by Allied bombing. It is now a museum.

See also
Communes of the Nord department

References

External links
 Official website

Communes of Nord (French department)
Burial sites of the House of Metz
French Flanders